Bejeweled (also referred as Bejeweled Deluxe in some releases) is a tile-matching puzzle video game by PopCap Games, developed for browsers in 2001. The first game developed by PopCap under their current name, Bejeweled, involves lining up three or more multi-colored gems to clear them from the game board, with chain reactions potentially following.

Originally starting out as a Java web browser game titled Diamond Mine, Bejeweled would later be developed into a retail title and was released for PCs on May 30, 2001, with the name Bejeweled Deluxe.

The game sold over 10 million copies and has been downloaded more than 150 million times. The game was followed by several sequels and spin-offs, with the game being followed by a direct sequel in 2004.

Gameplay

The main objective of Bejeweled involves attempting to swap two adjacent gems of seven colors (colored red, orange, yellow, green, blue, purple and white) to create a line or row of three or more gems, which disappear once lined up. Lining up more than four gems or performing multiple matches at once awards bonus points. When gems are cleared from the board, gems above the game board fall downwards, potentially causing chain reactions, which award more points to the player. The player is able to use the Hint button to find a match, but will subtract points and reduce the progress bar if used.

Bejeweled features two game modes, each with a different set of rules.

The Normal (Simple in the web version) game mode involves attempting to score as many points as possible. Scoring points increases the progress bar on the bottom of the screen. When filled completely, the player progresses to the next level, where the number of points earned are multiplied by x0.5 per level. The number of points required to reach the next level increase within each level. When no more moves are possible, the game ends.

The Time Trial (Timed in the web version) game mode features similar rules to the Normal mode, with the only difference being that the progress bar retracts when the player is not making any moves. The number of points received are slightly higher than the Normal mode. The progress bar starts halfway and retracts faster in later levels. When the bar empties, the game ends. If the player runs out of moves, a new game board appears instead of getting a game over.

Development 
Development on Bejeweled began around 2000 following Sexy Action Cool's rebranding to PopCap Games, with the team wanting to make a game that was "simple, web-based, and made in Java". Diamond Mine was mainly based on Colors Game (Shariki), a game that involves matching three or more colored boxes, but lacked unique visuals, animation or sound.  The development team disliked the presentation (as the game was poorly coded and needed a page refresh for every move) but liked the gameplay, which led them to recreate the game with an improved presentation. The team decided to give the playing pieces (which were originally squares) unique looks to give them personality, and make the game accessible for colorblind people. The team decided on what objects would be used as the playing pieces. Fruits were considered at one point, but was rejected since many fruits "looked too round". Gems were considered as well, but was rejected after not being able to find interesting variations of gemstones on the internet. The team decided to use simple geometric shapes, but found them to be boring, until game designer Jason Kapalka brought up ideas for playing pieces; a few of them which involved transforming the geometrical shapes to give them a "gem-like appearance", which led to gems being used in the final product.

Originally, the game was planned to release without any timed modes, but a time limit feature was added to give the game "an arcade-like feel". Around the time the game was almost finished, a difficulty level without the time limit was added in-game as the default starting level, which was intended to act as a tutorial. Diamond Mine was developed on the Java platform and was released for web browsers in November 2000. The game's original name, Diamond Mine, was named after the song by Canadian country rock band Blue Rodeo, and featured a cave mining theme. Development on Diamond Mine lasted less than a month.

PopCap later developed Diamond Mine into a full title with partnership of Microsoft, which allowed the Microsoft Zone and other game sites to host Bejeweled, including advertisement versions of the game. However Microsoft suggested a name change as the name sounded too similar to an existing game, Diamond Mines, and wanted a unique name of the game for their website. Microsoft suggested the name Bejeweled, a pun to the film Bedazzled, along with other names. Originally, game designer Jason Kapalka heavily disliked the Bejeweled name out of all the names suggested, but eventually the team went with the Bejeweled name. Development on Bejeweled Deluxe lasted about three months. Jason Kapalka provided the voice of the announcer in the game. The soundtrack for Bejeweled Deluxe was composed by Peter Hajba.

Release 
The original release of Bejeweled, Diamond Mine, was released for browsers in November 2000. The retail version of the game, Bejeweled Deluxe, featured pre-rendered 3D sprites, in-game music, a save feature and more. It was originally released for Microsoft Windows on May 30, 2001. A port for the Mac OS X was developed and published by MacPlay and released in 2002.

Ports and re-releases 
The game has been ported to several different platforms following the release of Bejeweled Deluxe. Ports for the BlackBerry PDA, Palm OS and Windows Mobile were developed by Astraware and released in 2001. A version for Xbox was developed by Oberon Media and released as a downloadable Xbox Live Arcade game. A web app version of the game made for iOS Safari was released on October 11, 2007. A plug-and-play version of the game was developed by PopCap and HotGen, and published by Jakks Pacific in 2008. A version for the iPod Clickwheel was developed by Astraware and was released on September 12, 2006.

A version of the game for Java-supported cell phones was published by Electronic Arts in 2008.

The iPod, Java and plug-and-play versions of the game feature Bejeweled 2 graphics and sound, instead of the game's original graphics and sound.

Legacy 
The success of the game led to the creation of several sequels and spin-offs, with Bejeweled 2, a sequel to the game, releasing in 2004. Other sequels include Bejeweled 3, Bejeweled Twist, Bejeweled Blitz, Bejeweled Stars and more.

In 2020, Bejeweled was inducted into the World Video Game Hall of Fame.

References

External links 
 Official site
 Bejeweled on MobyGames

 
2001 video games
Cancelled Game Boy Advance games
Browser games
Flash games
Classic Mac OS games
MacOS games
IPod games
PopCap games
IOS games
Palm OS games
Windows Mobile Professional games
Windows Mobile Standard games
Windows games
Xbox games
Original Xbox Live Arcade games
Android (operating system) games
Video games developed in the United States
Video games scored by Peter Hajba
Windows Phone games
Casual games
Single-player video games
J2ME games
World Video Game Hall of Fame
Oberon Media games
HotGen games